Reza Chahkhandagh (born July 29, 1982) is an Iranian judoka.

Participating at the 2004 Olympic Games, he was stopped in the repechage round of 16 by Adil Belgaid of Morocco. He finished in joint fifth place in the half-middleweight (81 kg) division at the 2006 Asian Games, having lost to Takashi Ono of Japan in the bronze medal match.

External links
2006 Asian Games profile

1982 births
Living people
Iranian male judoka
Judoka at the 2004 Summer Olympics
Olympic judoka of Iran
Judoka at the 2006 Asian Games
Asian Games competitors for Iran
21st-century Iranian people